Merbein South is a locality in Victoria, Australia, located approximately  from Mildura. At the 2016 census, Merbein South had a population of 405.

The Post Office opened on 14 September 1915.

References

External links

Towns in Victoria (Australia)
Mallee (Victoria)